Douglas Charles Neil (3 February 1924 – 21 February 1994) was a Canadian lawyer and politician. Neil served as a Progressive Conservative party member of the House of Commons of Canada. He was born in Lipton, Saskatchewan.

He represented Saskatchewan's Moose Jaw electoral district at which he was elected in 1972. Neil won re-election there in the 1974, 1979 and 1980 federal elections. He left federal politics in 1984 for personal causes and did not campaign in that year's national elections after serving in the 29th to 32nd Canadian Parliaments.

References

External links
 

1924 births
1994 deaths
Members of the House of Commons of Canada from Saskatchewan
Progressive Conservative Party of Canada MPs